Bellmunt may refer to:
Bellmunt de Mesquí or Belmonte de San José, town in Aragon
Bellmunt d'Urgell, town in Catalonia
Bellmunt del Priorat, town in Catalonia
Bellmunt de Segarra, village in Catalonia
Bellmunt, mountain in the Sub-Pyrenees